Lower Kinnerton is a village and former civil parish, now in the parish of Dodleston, in the unitary authority of Cheshire West and Chester and the ceremonial county of Cheshire, England, close to the England–Wales border. The neighbouring village of Higher Kinnerton is across the border in Flintshire. Lower Kinnerton is south of Broughton and to the north west of the village of Dodleston. It is a small agricultural community, which is also home to a local kennel and cattery business. 

The civil parish was abolished in 2015 and merged into Dodleston.

The population was recorded at 97 in 1801, 94 in 1851, 127 in 1901 and 142 in 1951. In the 2001 census it had a population of 119, increasing to 136 at the 2011 census.

Lower Kinnerton Hall (also known as Bridge Farm Farmhouse) was built in 1685, using brown brick with stone dressings and with a slated roof. Attached to the building is a shippon (cattle-shed) dating from the 18th century. Lower Kinnerton Hall is a designated Grade II listed building.

See also

Listed buildings in Lower Kinnerton

References

External links

Villages in Cheshire
Former civil parishes in Cheshire
Cheshire West and Chester